Sailing/Yachting is an Olympic sport starting from the 1896 Olympics in Athens, Greece). With the exception of 1904 and possibly the canceled 1916 Summer Olympics, sailing has always been included on the Olympic schedule.
The Sailing program of 1988 consisted of a total of eight sailing classes (disciplines). For each class seven races were scheduled from 20 September 1988 to 27 September 1988 of the coast of Busan and was the first time that a separate event was allocated exclusively for women (sailed in the 470 class). The sailing was done on the triangular type Olympic courses.

Venue 

According to the IOC statutes the contests in all sport disciplines must be held either in, or as close as possible to the city which the IOC has chosen. Since the sailing conditions of the coast near Seoul are not very suitable for Olympic sailing Busan was chosen for the 1988 Sailing event. 
A total of two race areas were created of the coast of Busan.

Busan in Korea was reportedly a light wind venue but no one realised until too late that this information came from the airport which was located in a sheltered valley. It turned out to be that the 1988 Olympic Games were one of the windiest ever with one day of racing postponed due to too much wind. One day of racing saw around 30 knots of wind with 5 knots of current going against the wind. There was a lot of equipment damage and rescues for many classes resulting in many sailors did not finish and requests for redress.

Competition

Overview

Continents 
 Africa
 Asia
 Oceania
 Europe
 Americas

Countries

Classes (equipment)

Medal summary

Women's event

Men's event

Open events

Medal table

Remarks

Sailing 
 For the first time a specific female event 470 female was on the program. Prior to that all events were open to both men and women.

Sailors 
During the Sailing regattas at the 1988 Summer Olympics among others the following persons were competing in the various classes:
 , Paul Elvstrøm

References

Sources
 

 
1988 Summer Olympics events
1988
1988 in sailing
Sailing competitions in South Korea
Sports competitions in Busan